The 1962–63 season was the 64th season for FC Barcelona.

Results

External links

webdelcule.com

References

FC Barcelona seasons
Barcelona